Khurik is a rural locality (a selo) and the administrative centre of  Khuriksky Selsoviet, Tabasaransky District, Republic of Dagestan, Russia. The population was 2,530 as of 2010. There are 8 streets.

Geography 
Khurik is located 8 km northwest of Khuchni (the district's administrative centre) by road. Rugudzh is the nearest rural locality.

References 

Rural localities in Tabasaransky District